
Publius Consentius was a 5th-century  Latin grammarian and the author of two treatises, which are perhaps the fragments of a complete grammar: one entitled, Ars de Duabus Partibus Orationis, Nomine et Verbo, on the noun and the verb, much used during the Carolingian period; and the other, Ars de Barbarismis et Metaplasmis, on barbarisms and metaplasm.  The latter refers to a third essay, de Structurarum Ratione, on the structure of periods, which, if ever published, is no longer extant.

Nomine et Verbo was published by J. Sichard at Basel in 1528, and subsequently, in a much more complete form, in the collection of Putschius, who had access to manuscripts which enabled him to supply numerous and large deficiencies.  De Barbarismis was discovered by Cramer in a Regensburg manuscript now at Munich, and was published at Berlin by Buttmann in 1817.

Consentius is believed to have lived at Constantinople in the middle of the fifth century, and may have been the same as the poet Consentius, his son, or his grandson.  The poet and his grandson are praised by Sidonius Apollinaris, but the son may be the best candidate for the grammarian.  According to Fabricius, in some manuscripts the grammarian is styled not only vir clarissimus, the ordinary appellation of learned men at that period, but also quintus consularis quinque civitatem, indicating that he had achieved high office and imperial favour.  Consentius the son rose to high honour under Valentinian III, by whom he was named Comes Palatii, and dispatched upon an important mission to Theodosius II.

Some of Consentius' ideas are surprisingly modern. He explicitly differentiates signifié and signifiant, the word itself and the thing signified by it. He explains grammatical gender by saying that masculine or feminine gender was ascribed, either randomly or by some consensus (seu licenter seu decenter), to some entities which lack natural gender.

See also
 Consentia (gens)

Notes

References
Keil, Grammatici Latini (Leipzig), vol. V, p. 336.
Thorsten Fögen, Der Grammatiker Consentius, Glotta 74 (1997/98), 164–192.

External links
Corpus Grammaticorum Latinorum: complete texts and full bibliography
http://www.newadvent.org/cathen/04284a.htm

Year of birth missing
Year of death missing
Ancient linguists
Grammarians of Latin
5th-century Latin writers